Pierre Koffmann (born 21 August 1948) is a French professional chef. He was one of a handful of chefs in the United Kingdom to have been awarded the coveted three Michelin stars at his restaurant La Tante Claire in London. Until December 2016, he was the head chef of Koffmann's at The Berkeley hotel in Knightsbridge, London.

Early life
Koffmann was born in Tarbes, France, on 21 August 1948. He is of Alsatian German ancestry from his paternal side. His father worked as a mechanic for Citroën. It was with his maternal grandparents, Camille and Marcel, in Saint-Puy that he learned how to cook when he visited with them during school holidays. Koffmann reminisced about this period in his 1990 book Memories of Gascony, and discussed it in an interview with The Guardian in 2010: "The produce was mostly from the farm. Steak was rare; we ate a lot of poultry. My grandmother did own a cooker, but most of her work was done over an open fire." In 1963, he left school and applied for a variety of jobs, but ultimately decided to attend cookery school for the next three years.

Career
Koffmann first worked as a chef in Strasbourg and Toulon, before moving in 1970 to the United Kingdom to work with Michel and Albert Roux at Le Gavroche. Koffmann originally only wanted to move to the UK so that he could see England play France at rugby at Twickenham Stadium. He moved to the Roux brothers' Waterside Inn in Bray, Berkshire, in 1972, being made the first head chef of the new restaurant, where he met his future wife Annie who was the restaurant's manager.

He opened his first restaurant, La Tante Claire, in 1977 in Royal Hospital Road, Chelsea. Six years after it opened, the restaurant gained its third Michelin star. La Tante Claire moved to The Berkeley hotel in Knightsbridge, London, in 1998, with the former site being sold to become the flagship restaurant of Gordon Ramsay. During his time at La Tante Claire, Koffmann worked with several eminent chefs, including Ramsay, Marco Pierre White, Marcus Wareing and Tom Kitchin. He did not get on with Wareing, who made his feelings clear about Koffmann in Simon Wright's book Tough Cookies, saying of Koffmann: "Three-star kitchen! This guy didn't tell you anything. He didn't tell you what the lunch menu was, he didn't tell you where to get anything… You didn't know if you were coming or going… I could not click with the man." More recently Wareing speaks better of Koffmann, saying "Koffmann is a complete thoroughbred. He ran the kitchen from the stove." The signature dish of the restaurant was pig's trotter with chicken mousseline, sweetbreads and morels. Marco Pierre White has called this his "favourite dish of all time".

Following the death of his wife Annie, he closed La Tante Claire in 2003. The space became the flagship restaurant of Marcus Wareing. After taking a break from restaurants, he was briefly head chef at the Bleeding Heart pub in Clerkenwell. In 2009, he opened a pop-up restaurant at Selfridges in London for ten days as part of the London food festival. He decided to serve classic dishes from La Tante Claire instead of new dishes as he originally planned – "that's not what people want. They want the pig's trotter, the foie gras, the pistachio soufflé. But maybe I do a new dish each day, as a special." The ten days turned into two months. Koffmann described the first month as "a kind of hell", but he got used to the hours again during the second month, and began to ponder opening a new restaurant: "I started to think about a new restaurant. I thought: why not? I still enjoy it. When you are a chef, your place is in the kitchen."

Koffmann's at The Berkeley hotel opened on 30 June 2010, at the former site of Gordon Ramsay's Boxwood Cafe; it was Koffmann's first full restaurant venture since the closure of La Tante Claire in 2003 at the same hotel. He said he was no longer chasing Michelin stars, and would instead cook the Gascon style food he remembered from his childhood.

Koffmann's at The Berkeley closed on 31 December 2016. The space it occupied was due to be replaced by a gym.

In 2021, he launched a restaurant-review website koffmannandvines.com with Richard Vines, the former Chief Food Critic at Bloomberg.

References

External links
Koffmann's at The Berkeley

1948 births
Living people
French chefs
People from Tarbes
Head chefs of Michelin starred restaurants